Ładna  is a village in the administrative district of Gmina Skrzyszów, within Tarnów County, Lesser Poland Voivodeship, in southern Poland.

The village has a population of 1,300.

References

Villages in Tarnów County